Paolo Garbisi (born 26 April 2000) is an Italian professional rugby union player who primarily plays fly-half for Montpellier of the Top 14. He has also represented Italy at international level, having made his test debut against Ireland during the 2020 Six Nations Championship. Garbisi has previously played for clubs such as Mogliano, Petrarca, and Benetton in the past.

Club career 
Born in Venice, Garbisi first played rugby for Mogliano, before joining the FIR academy for the 2018–19 season.

For the last matches of 2019–20 season and for 2020–21 season, Garbisi was signed by Benetton as permit player, along with some of his under-20 teammates, who were part of this successful Italian generation, having beaten teams such as Wales and Scotland.

International career 
Garbisi was part of both the under-17 and under-18 Italian national teams, featuring in a surprise win against England for the U18s.
Garbisi was named in the Italy Under-20 squad for both the 2019 and 2020 Six Nations Under 20s Championship.
He featured in the 2019 World Rugby Under 20 Championship, and was set to lead his country in the 2020 edition, before that it was canceled due to the COVID-19 pandemic.

In July 2020, he was selected for Italy for the first time by coach Franco Smith for a training camp. From October 2020 he is also part of Italy squad. In Italy's final match of the 2022 Six Nations Championship against Wales, Garbisi scored the winning conversion at the end of the match to win Italy's first Six Nations match since 2015 with a 22-21 scoreline.

References

External links 

Paolo Garbisi at Benetton Rugby
Paolo Garbisi at RugbyPass

Italian rugby union players
2000 births
Living people
Rugby union fly-halves
Italy international rugby union players
Mogliano Rugby players
Petrarca Rugby players
Benetton Rugby players
Montpellier Hérault Rugby players